"Yes I Will", also known as "I'll Be True to You", is a song written by Gerry Goffin and Russ Titelman. The song was first recorded in 1964 by British Beat group the Hollies who released it as a single in January 1965 where it peaked at number 9 in the United Kingdom that April. Two versions of this song were released by the Hollies. An alternate take with prominent acoustic guitars and a different intro was included on the band's 1968 Greatest Hits album in the UK. This is often described as an "erroneous" version because it does not reflect what was heard on the single. 

While a top 10 hit in the UK, it failed to chart entirely in the US and Canada where it was released two months later on the Imperial and Capitol labels, respectively. It would not see re-release on LP in either of those countries and original copies of the single are scarce.

Cover versions
A version of the song titled "I'll Be True to You" was recorded by the Monkees and included on their 1966 self-titled debut album. Australian group the Twilights also recorded a version on their eponymous 1966 album.

Charts

References

1965 singles
The Hollies songs
The Monkees songs
Parlophone singles
Songs with lyrics by Gerry Goffin
Songs written by Russ Titelman
1964 songs
Imperial Records singles